Giuseppe Maria Martelli (1678 – 1741) was an Italian Roman Catholic archbishop of Florence from 1722 to 1740.

Biography
He was born to the aristocratic Martelli family. He rose rapidly in ecclesiastical rank, becoming prior of San Lorenzo and synod examiner for the dioceses of Florence and Fiesolo. He surpervised a synod of the diocese in 1732. In Florence, he helped refurbish the Palazzo Arcivescovile and the church of San Salvatore al Vescovo. He was buried in the church of San Michele e Gaetano.

References

 La chiesa fiorentina, Curia arcivescovile, Florence 1970.

1678 births
1741 deaths
18th-century Roman Catholic archbishops
Roman Catholic archbishops of Florence
Italian Roman Catholic archbishops